Lupiac is a commune in the Gers department in southwestern France.

Geography

The Auzoue forms most of the commune's southeastern border. The Douze forms the commune's western border.

Population

Literature
Charles de Batz de Castelmore d'Artagnan ( 1611 – 25 June 1673), a captain of the Musketeers of the Guard, was born here.  A fictionalized version of his life is central to The Three Musketeers by Alexandre Dumas, père.  Lupiac has a museum dedicated to him.

See also
 Communes of the Gers department

References

Communes of Gers